Liracraea odhneri is a species of sea snail, a marine gastropod mollusk in the family Mangeliidae.

There is one subspecies: Liracraea odhneri benthicola Dell, 1956

Description
The length of the shell attains 8 mm, its diameter 3.2 mm.

Distribution
This species is endemic to New Zealand occurs off North Island, upper South Island and Chatham Islands.

References

 Powell, A.W.B. 1979: New Zealand Mollusca: Marine, Land and Freshwater Shells, Collins, Auckland
Spencer, H.G., Marshall, B.A. & Willan, R.C. (2009). Checklist of New Zealand living Mollusca. pp 196–219. in: Gordon, D.P. (ed.) New Zealand inventory of biodiversity. Volume one. Kingdom Animalia: Radiata, Lophotrochozoa, Deuterostomia. Canterbury University Press, Christchurch.

External links
  Tucker, J.K. 2004 Catalog of recent and fossil turrids (Mollusca: Gastropoda). Zootaxa 682:1–1295.
 Gastropods.com: Liracraea odhneri odhneri

odhneri
Gastropods described in 1942
Gastropods of New Zealand